The 1982 World Rally Championship was the tenth season of the Fédération Internationale de l'Automobile (FIA) World Rally Championship (WRC). The season consisted of 12 rallies. By this time, the schedule format had become generally stable with only one or two changes to venues year to year. 1982 marked the return of New Zealand to the schedule in place of Argentina's Rally Codasur.

1982 was marked by the dominance of the Germans, with two German manufacturers Audi and Opel taking first and second in the manufacturer's title race, while Opel's driver, German Walter Röhrl, seized the driver's title. Top Audi pilots Michèle Mouton and Hannu Mikkola took second and third in the drivers' race, but their combined efforts were enough to put Audi over the top for the work's cup. Mouton's finish is the best by a female driver to this day.

As with previous seasons, while all 12 events were calculated for tallying the drivers' scores, only 10 of the events applied to the championship for manufacturers. The two events in 1982 which applied only to driver standings were Sweden and the Rallye Côte d'Ivoire. Röhrl's strong performance in both of these rallies would have improved Opel's bid for a world title had they counted for manufacturers as well as drivers.



Teams and drivers

Championship for manufacturers

Championship for drivers

Events

See also 
 1982 in sports

External links

 FIA World Rally Championship 1982 at ewrc-results.com

World Rally Championship
World Rally Championship seasons